Lance Allen Hooper (born June 1, 1967) is a race car driver and crew chief in NASCAR as well as several touring divisions. Hooper attended his first race when he was just two weeks old, and also came from a long line of racing champions, including his uncle, father, and brother. Hooper last served as the driver and crew chief of the No. 44 Key Motorsports Chevy in the Truck Series in 2009.

Racing career
Hooper first began racing in 1990 in the NASCAR Whelen All-American Series, and was named Rookie of the Year at Saugus Speedway. He went on to win the track championship there the next two years. Following that stint, Hooper moved up to the NASCAR Featherlite Southwest Series, and won seven races in his first year on the circuit, then won the championship in 1995. In addition to his success on Raceday, he won the pole award sixteen times, the Most Popular Driver award as well as breaking many track records.

After that, he moved to the NASCAR Winston West Series. In 1996, he won five races, as well as both the championship and the Rookie of the Year points title. That year, he made his Winston Cup debut as well, running the Dura Lube 500 and finishing 33rd in his own Pontiac. He soon caught the eye of owner Richard Jackson, owner of Precision Products Racing, and the two ran six races together in 1997 in the Winston Cup Series. In 1998, the two made an abbreviated bid at the Busch Series championship, running 16 races and finishing in the top-20 three times.

Hooper did not run much in 1999. He ran one Busch Series race for Jackson, and made an unsuccessful attempt at the Brickyard 400 with Fenley-Moore Motorsports after replacing Jeff Davis during qualifying. He returned to the sport regularly in 2000, running 13 races in the Craftsman Truck Series for Marty Walsh (his best finish was 15th) and four races for Alumni Motorsports in the Busch Series, including an outside pole qualifying run. Hooper made 18 Truck Series races in 2001, and had a tenth-place finish at Nazareth Speedway. Hooper also reunited with Jackson competed in a Cup race at Dover for Dark Horse Motorsports.

He ran every truck race in 2002, despite switching from Ware Racing Enterprises to Team Racing mid-season. Hooper ran his most recent Cup race to date that year, finishing 31st at Bristol Motor Speedway for Junie Donlavey. In 2003, Hooper began running his own entry in the Truck Series with fan-based sponsorships. He finished 24th in points that year. Hooper ran five races with ThorSport Racing, and had two top-twenty finishes in the No. 13 Silverado. He did not race again for five years, choosing to become a crew chief at the Truck level, working with ThorSport and Key Motorsports. He returned to the driver's seat in 2009 in the Trucks to drive the No. 44 entry for his then-employer, Key Motorsports, before finishing the year at Tagsby Racing.

Motorsports career results

NASCAR
(key) (Bold – Pole position awarded by qualifying time. Italics – Pole position earned by points standings or practice time. * – Most laps led.)

Winston Cup Series

Busch Series

Camping World Truck Series

Busch North Series

Winston West Series

ARCA Bondo/Mar-Hyde Series
(key) (Bold – Pole position awarded by qualifying time. Italics – Pole position earned by points standings or practice time. * – Most laps led.)

References

External links
 
 
 

Living people
1967 births
People from Palmdale, California
Racing drivers from California
NASCAR drivers
ARCA Menards Series drivers
NASCAR crew chiefs
Sportspeople from Los Angeles County, California